Tabalangut (Tabanguud) is a rural locality (an ulus) in Tunkinsky District, Republic of Buryatia, Russia. The population was 80 as of 2010. There are 3 streets.

Geography 
Tabalangut is located 48 km northeast of Kyren (the district's administrative centre) by road. Galbay is the nearest rural locality.

References 

Rural localities in Tunkinsky District